People's Instinctive Travels and the Paths of Rhythm is the debut studio album by American hip hop group A Tribe Called Quest, released on April 10, 1990 on Jive Records. After forming the Native Tongues collective and collaborating on several projects, A Tribe Called Quest began recording sessions for People's Instinctive Travels in late 1989 at Calliope Studios with completion reached in early 1990. The album's laid back production encompassed a diverse range of samples which functioned as a template for the group's unorthodox lyrics.

People's Instinctive Travels and the Paths of Rhythm was met with acclaim from professional music critics and the hip hop community on release, and was eventually certified gold in the United States on January 19, 1996. Its recognition has extended over the years as it is widely regarded as a central album in alternative hip hop with its unconventional production and lyricism. It is also credited for influencing many artists in both hip hop and R&B. In a commemorative article for XXL, Michael Blair wrote that "People's Instinctive Travels and the Paths of Rhythm was immensely groundbreaking, and will eternally maintain its relevance within the culture and construction of hip-hop".

Background 

A Tribe Called Quest formed in Queens, New York, in 1985. After establishing a friendship with hip-hop act Jungle Brothers, both groups formed a collective dubbed Native Tongues, which also included De La Soul.

Several years prior to recording People's Instinctive Travels and the Paths of Rhythm, group member Q-Tip created much of the album's production on pause tapes when he was in the 10th grade. He would have his first studio experience while recording with Jungle Brothers on their debut album Straight out the Jungle (1988). Although this was a learning experience, he acquired more recording and producing knowledge being present at all of De La Soul's 3 Feet High and Rising (1989) sessions. Recording engineer Shane Faber taught Q-Tip how to use equipment such as the E-mu SP-1200 and Akai S950 samplers, and soon-after, renowned producer Large Professor taught him how to use other equipment, for which he would expand upon on People's Instinctive Travels.

Initially, record labels would not sign A Tribe Called Quest due to their unconventional image and sound, but took interest after the success of 3 Feet High and Rising, which featured appearances from Q-Tip. The group hired Kool DJ Red Alert as their manager, and after shopping their demo to several major labels, they signed a contract with Jive Records in 1989.

Recording 

Recording for the album began in late 1989, and finished three months later in early 1990, with "Pubic Enemy" and "Bonita Applebum" as the first tracks recorded.

The group chose Calliope Studios as their primary studio, as it was renowned to promote artistic freedom. Jungle Brothers, Queen Latifah and Prince Paul with De La Soul and Stetsasonic, were all recording new music in separate rooms while A Tribe Called Quest recorded People's Instinctive Travels. Q-Tip later commented, "It was exciting. We were kinda left to our own devices. It was just a great environment, conductive for creating. We didn't have cell phones, we didn't have the internet, we didn't have a bunch of things to tear at us. When we got to the studio, the specific job was to make music. There was no TV in there. It was all instruments and speakers. It was just music."

Q-Tip and Ali Shaheed Muhammad would listen to records several seconds at a time, and re-work them in relationship with other records that would fit. Ali played all live instruments, DJ scratches and programming, while Q-Tip handled everything else with production, including sampling and mixing.

Although claiming that "we all helped put the album together", Q-Tip was the only group member present at every recording session. Group member Phife Dawg later admitted, "I was being ignorant on that first album, that's why I was only on a couple of tracks. I was hardly around. I would have rather hung out with my boys on the street and got my hustle on rather than gone in the studio. I wasn't even on the contract for the first album. I was thinking me and Jarobi were more like back-ups for Tip and Ali, but Tip and Ali really wanted me to come through and do my thing".

Music and lyrics 

People's Instinctive Travels and the Paths of Rhythm has been described as "a celebration of bohemia, psychedelia and vagabondia", as well as "laid back". The Los Angeles Times described the album as consisting of "mostly happy hip-hop, featuring gently humorous, casual, conversational raps". Michael Blair from XXL wrote that "the innovative production on this album created an optimal platform for the group's wildly inventive relationship with their words. From a lyrical standpoint, Tribe was both sophisticated and playful in the same breath".

Much of the musical landscape on the album consisted of background noises such as a child crying, frogs and Hawaiian strings. The jazz, R&B and rock samples that were used were from artists that most hip-hop producers of the time ignored, or who were unfamiliar with. For the known artists that were sampled, Q-Tip used breaks that were unique for those artists, which turned out to be highly influential for hip-hop production. Ian McCann from NME stated "They break beats from anywhere they want ... and deliver them in an easy, totally sympathetic setting." Entertainment Weeklys Greg Sandow said the album "has a casual sound, something like laid-back jazz".

Regarding the album's lyrics, Kris Ex from Pitchfork said  "The rhymes here are at once conversational and repressed, the topics concurrently large and small. The lyrics are 25 years old. But were they released today they'd seem right on time."

Critical reception 

People's Instinctive Travels and the Paths of Rhythm was met with widespread acclaim from critics. Ian McCann from NME wrote that "A Tribe Called Quest put no feet in the wrong place here. This is not rap, it's near perfection". Entertainment Weeklys Greg Sandow commented that on the album, rather than "defining Afrocentric living", the group "more or less exemplifies it with no fuss at all". Robert Tanzilo from Chicago Tribune stated that the album "avoids the gimmickry and circus atmosphere" of the group's contemporaries, while "focusing solely on the music".

Writing for Los Angeles Times, Dennis Hunt called the album "fascinating" and wrote "These songs lope along in a quirkly, jazz-like pace. They're intriguingly non-linear and quite provocative, even though their meaning is somewhat elusive". In an enthusiastic review, The Source gave it the first "five-mic" rating in the magazine's history, and called it a "completely musical and spiritual approach to hip-hop," as well as "a voyage to the land of positive vibrations, and each cut is a new experience". Chuck Eddy from Rolling Stone stated "the real pleasure on People's Instinctive Travels and the Paths of Rhythm comes from a detailed mesh of instruments and incidental sounds", but went on to say "the rappers of A Tribe Called Quest tend to mumble in understated monotones that feel self-satisfied, even bored".

 Retrospect 
John Bush of AllMusic said "Restless and ceaselessly imaginative, Tribe perhaps experimented too much on their debut, but they succeeded at much of it, certainly enough to show much promise as a new decade dawned". Spin magazine wrote "following in the ground-breaking footsteps of their Native Tongues brethren, Tribe's laid-back debut had no heavy handed political or battle raps, just youthful exuberance and playfully goofy lyrics. While praising the album's production and lyricism, Pitchfork'''s Kris Ex called it "clean and focused", and credited it for showcasing the group as "whimsical yet grounded in reality". He went on to write "all these many years later People's Instinctive Travels and the Paths of Rhythm is more than a nostalgia artifact. It's a worthy listen, not because of what it was, but because of what it is". Dave Heaton of PopMatters called the album "brilliant" and said it was "an introduction to Q-Tip's talent." In his 5th edition of Encyclopedia of Popular Music, Colin Larkin rated the album three stars and called it "eclectic and self-consciously jokey".

 Accolades 

Since its release, People's Instinctive Travels and the Paths of Rhythm has been included on numerous "best of" lists compiled by music writers and journalists. The following information is adapted from Acclaimed Music.

 Legacy People's Instinctive Travels and the Paths of Rhythm has been recognized for widening hip-hop's vocabulary, as well as instrumentation and samples within hip-hop music. It has also been recognized for influencing a wide range of acclaimed hip-hop and R&B artists, including Common, D'Angelo, Digable Planets, Erykah Badu, Fugees, J Dilla, Kendrick Lamar, Mos Def, Outkast, Scarface, and Kanye West. Pharrell Williams stated "I listened to 'Bonita' everyday. I'd never heard anything like that in my life. That's where I changed". On another occasion, Williams explained that People's Instinctive Travels "caused a turning point in my life, which made me see that music was art."

John Bush of AllMusic called People's Instinctive Travels and the Paths of Rhythm "the quiet beginning of a revolution in non-commercial hip-hop." Pitchforks Kris Ex stated that with the album the group "created and refined a template for '90s hip-hop that was street-astute, worldly, and more inspirational than aspirational". In a commemorative article for XXL, Michael Blair wrote "What A Tribe Called Quest ultimately became the pioneers of, and was on full display throughout the production on their debut album, was a certain proficiency in illustrating and honoring a diverse array of genres that preceded them. In what is mostly attributed to Q-Tip's deep appreciation and understanding of those definitive genres, Tribe's sound was perpetually laced with elements of Jazz, Soul, R&B, and Funk". Blair concluded that "People's Instinctive Travels and the Paths of Rhythm was immensely groundbreaking, and will eternally maintain its relevance within the culture and construction of hip-hop".

Hip-hop journalist Harry Allen described the album as a turning point in hip-hop where artists did not have to be "tough". A Tribe Called Quest member Ali Shaheed Muhammad further elaborated that "LL Cool J, Big Daddy Kane, KRS-One, N.W.A, even Public Enemy, had a tough guy image. It was this bravado at the time that all the hip-hop artists had. People's Instinctive Travels wasn't any of that. We weren't trying to be tough guys. It was about having fun, being lighthearted, being witty, being poetic. Just being good with one another. That's what we presented. Just be. Just exist. Be comfortable in your own skin. People's Instinctive Travels'' was about celebrating you, whoever you are".

Track listing
All tracks written and produced by A Tribe Called Quest. Credits from album liner notes.

Partial sample credits
 "Push it Along" contains a sample from "Loran's Dance", as performed by Grover Washington Jr.
 "Luck of Lucien" contains a sample from "All You Need Is Love", as performed by The Beatles, and "Forty Days", as performed by Billy Brooks.
 "Footprints" contains samples from "Sir Duke", as performed by Stevie Wonder and "Think Twice", as performed by Donald Byrd.
 "I Left My Wallet in El Segundo" contains a sample from "Let's Get Funky", as performed by The Chambers Brothers.
 "Bonita Applebum" contains samples from "Daylight", as performed by RAMP, "Memory Band", as performed by Rotary Connection and "Soul Virgo", as performed by Cannonball Adderley.
 "Can I Kick It?" contains samples from "Spinning Wheel", as performed by Lonnie Smith and "Walk on the Wild Side", as performed by Lou Reed.
 "Mr. Muhammad" contains a sample from "Brazilian Rhyme (Beijo)", as performed by Earth, Wind & Fire.
 "Ham 'n' Eggs" contains a sample from "Nappy Dugout", as performed by Funkadelic.
 "Go Ahead in the Rain" contains a sample from "Slide", as performed by Slave.
 "Description of a Fool" contains a sample from "Running Away", as performed by Roy Ayers.
 "Rhythm (Dedicated to the Art of Moving Butts) contains a sample from "Get Off Your Ass and Jam", as performed by Funkadelic.

Personnel 
 Q-Tip – performer, production, mixing
 Ali Shaheed Muhammad – scratching, programming
 Phife Dawg – performer
 Jarobi White – performer
 Lucien – background vocals
 Bob Power – engineer
 Shane Faber – engineer
 Tim Latham – engineer
 Bob Coulter – engineer
 Anthony Saunders – engineer
 Kool DJ Red Alert – management, executive producer
 Paije Hunyady – cover art
 Bryant Peters – cover art
 Ari Marcopoulos – photography
 Justin Herz – photography

Charts

Weekly charts

Year-end charts

Certifications

References

Bibliography

External links 
 
People's Instinctive Travels and the Paths of Rhythm at YouTube (streamed copy where licensed)

A Tribe Called Quest albums
1990 debut albums
Jive Records albums
Albums produced by Q-Tip (musician)